Yevgeny Primakov's Cabinet (September 11, 1998, - May 12, 1999) was the seventh cabinet of government of the Russian Federation, preceded by Sergei Kiriyenko's Cabinet fallen as a result of the 1998 Russian financial crisis and followed by Sergei Stepashin's Cabinet. It was led by Prime Minister Yevgeny Primakov, proposed by President Boris Yeltsin on September 10, 1998, as Viktor Chernomyrdin had failed to be approved by the State Duma twice by September 7 (August 31: 94 in favor, 252 against, nobody abstained, September 7: 138 in favor, 273 against, 1 abstained) ; According to the Constitution of Russia, if parliament rejects the president's nomination three times, then parliament must be dissolved and a general election held. On September 11 Primakov was approved by the Duma as Prime Minister (317 in favor, 63 against, 15 abstained) and appointed Prime Minister by the President. In the State Duma only Vladimir Zhirinovsky's Liberal Democratic Party of Russia was both in favor of Chernomyrdin and against Primakov.

Fourteen ministers of the government out of thirty-one held positions in the previous cabinet: Primakov (Minister for External Affairs), Maslyukov (Minister of Industry and Trade), Bulgak (Minister of Science and Technology), Adamov, Stepashin, Gazizullin, Shoigu, Sergeyev, Aksyonenko, Semyonov, Generalov, Frank, Zadornov, Krasheninnikov (the same positions).

According to the Russian legislation, the ministers were appointed by the President.

On May 12, 1999 Yeltsin sacked the government and Prime Minister and claimed that Primakov had failed to improve the economy after the 1998 Russian financial crisis. By then Primakov had become the most popular Russian politician. The real reason of the government reshuffle was considered linked to the upcoming start of impeachment hearings against Yeltsin in the State Duma (Primakov refused to fire ministers belonging to the Communist Party).

Ministers

|}

References

Primakov
1998 establishments in Russia
1999 disestablishments in Russia
Cabinets established in 1998
Cabinets disestablished in 1999